Larry Ernest Blackmon (born May 24, 1956) is an American vocalist and musician who gained acclaim as the lead singer and founder frontman of the funk and R&B band Cameo.

Musical career 
Starting the band "East Coast", Blackmon formed the "New York City Players" as a complement to the Ohio Players.  Having to rename the group because of a conflict, Blackmon later called the group Cameo. Blackmon lived in Harlem and played drums on several hits for the band Black Ivory. He is the son of Lee Black, a former boxer. Along with his unique vocal style, Blackmon's other personal touches included sporting an elaborate hi-top fade haircut and a codpiece over his pants. His signature "Ow!" was used as the intro for some of the band's songs. The group Cameo appeared at Adventureland Palace, sponsored by Black Pride Inc., on April 26, 1978. Blackmon founded Atlanta-based funk quartet CA$HFLOW, which had a hit with "Mine All Mine" in 1986.

Guest appearances 
Blackmon appeared as a backing vocalist on Ry Cooder's 1987 album Get Rhythm and Cyndi Lauper's 1989 album A Night to Remember. He also had co-producer credits on Eddie Murphy's 1989 album So Happy. The snare drum sound that Blackmon created for "Word Up!" and "Candy" was duplicated on releases by a wide range of artists.

Personal life 
One of Blackmon's sons is heavily involved in the New York political scene, while another son is currently involved in the hip hop music industry.

See also
Atlanta Artists

References

1956 births
Living people
American rhythm and blues musicians
Singer-songwriters from New York (state)
Record producers from New York (state)
People from Harlem
African-American  male singer-songwriters
American rhythm and blues singer-songwriters
20th-century African-American male singers